Cochlitoma zebra is a species of giant snail in the family Achatinidae.

References 

Achatinidae
Gastropods described in 1792
Taxa named by Jean Guillaume Bruguière